Enrico Bovone (30 March 1946 – 2 May 2001) was an Italian basketball player. He was part of the Italian team that finished eighth at 1968 Summer Olympics. Bovone was married twice and both time divorced; he had five children from one of those marriages. He committed suicide on 2 May 2011, aged 55.

References

1946 births
2001 deaths
2001 suicides
Italian men's basketball players
1967 FIBA World Championship players
Olympic basketball players of Italy
Basketball players at the 1968 Summer Olympics
Pallacanestro Milano 1958 players
Suicides in Italy
People from Novi Ligure
Sportspeople from the Province of Alessandria